Elections for the members of the Senate were held on April 23, 1946, in the Philippines (pursuant to Commonwealth Act No. 725).

Background
Soon after the reconstitution of the Commonwealth Government in 1945 Senators Manuel Roxas, Elpidio Quirino and their allies called for an early national election to choose the president and vice president of the Philippines and members of the Congress. In December 1945, the House Insular Affairs of the United States Congress approved the joint resolution setting the election date at not later than April 30, 1946.

Prompted by this congressional action, President Sergio Osmeña called the Philippine Congress to a three-day special session. Congress enacted Commonwealth Act No. 725, setting the election on April 23, 1946, and was approved by President Osmeña on January 5, 1946.

There are 24 seats in the Senate, with eight seats up every election for every three years starting from the first election in 1941. Of the results in that election, the first eight would have served for six years, the next eight for four years, and the last eight for two years. Due to the intervention of World War II and the destruction of records, this election was the next election since 1941, and that lots were drawn on the 16 seats that would have been up in this election, and those eight seats that would be up in 1947. Of the sixteen seats up in this election, the first eight would serve until 1951, while the last eight would serve until 1949.

Retiring incumbents

Nacionalista Party 

 Antonio de las Alas
 Nicolas Buendia
 Ramon J. Fernandez
Domingo Imperial
 Rafael Martinez
Jose Yulo

Nacionalista Party (Liberal wing) 

 Quintin Paredes
 Ran for representative from Abra and won
 Elpidio Quirino
 Ran for vice president of the Philippines and won
 Manuel Roxas
 Ran for president of the Philippines and won

Mid-term vacancies 

 Daniel Maramba (Nacionalista), died on December 28, 1941
 Jose Ozamiz (Nacionalista), executed on February 11, 1944

Senators running elsewhere 

 Eulogio Rodriguez (Nacionalista) ran for vice president of the Philippines and lost

Results
The election was generally peaceful and orderly except in some places where passions ran high, especially in the province of Pampanga. According to the controversial decision of the Electoral Tribunal of the House of Representatives on Meliton Soliman vs. Luis Taruc, Pampanga "was under the terroristic clutches and control of the Hukbalahaps. So terrorized were the people of Arayat, at one time, 200 persons abandoned their homes, their work, and their food, all their belongings in a mass evacuation to the poblacion due to fear and terror."

The dominant Nacionalista Party was divided into two wings in this election. The Liberal wing was led by Senate President Manuel Roxas, while the original Nacionalista Party was headed by President Sergio Osmeña. Roxas defeated Osmeña in the concurrent presidential election, while Roxas's running mate Senator Elpidio Quirino defeated Osmeña's running mate Senator Eulogio Rodriguez.

In the Senate elections, the Liberal wing won nine seats, the original Nacionalista Party won six seats, and the Popular Front won one.

These senators from Liberal wing defended their seats: Melecio Arranz, Mariano Jesus Cuenco, and Ramon Torres. Carlos P. Garcia was the sole senator from the original Nacionalista Party to defend his seat.

Newcomer senators include the Liberal wing's topnotcher Vicente J. Francisco, Jose Avelino, Olegario Clarin, Enrique Magalona, and Salidapa Pendatun. Neophytes from the original Nacionalista Party are Tomas Confesor, Alejo Mabanag, Tomas Cabili, and Ramon Diokno. Newcomer Vicente Sotto was the sole candidate of the Popular Front elected.

Jose Vera of the original Nacionalista Party, who last served in the Senate when it was abolished in 1935, is the sole senator to make a comeback.

The Liberal Party won nine out of 16 contested senatorial seats; the first eight senators would serve until 1951, and the second eight until 1949:

Key:
 ‡ Seats up
 ^ Vacancy
 + Gained by a party from another party
 √ Held by the incumbent
 * Held by the same party with a new senator

Per party
The Nacionalistas originally won 7 seats. but an election protest unseated a Nacionalista senator in favor of a Liberal one in 1946.

See also 
Commission on Elections
2nd Congress of the Commonwealth of the Philippines

References

External links
 The Philippine Presidency Project
 Official website of the Commission on Elections

1946
General election
April 1946 events in Asia